Quiddler is a card game and word game created by Set Enterprises. Players compete by spelling English words from cards in hands of increasing size, each card worth various points. The game combines aspects of Scrabble and gin rummy. The word "Quiddler" is a trademark.

Play and scoring

Game play 
Before play begins, all the cards are shuffled. A game of Quiddler consists of eight rounds; the first round has a three-card hand, the second round has a four-card hand, and so on until the game ends with a ten-card hand. While there is a single-player variation, the regular game requires at least two players.

In the first round, the dealer deals out three cards to each player. The remaining cards form a draw pile. The top card is turned over to start a discard pile. The player to the dealer's left goes first. The player may choose the top card from either the draw pile (card is face down) or the discard pile (card is face up). The player adds this card to their hand. The player ends their turn by discarding one card from their hand so that the player ends up with the same number of cards as were dealt. A player may not use a dictionary during their turn, but the other players may. Turns are taken in the same manner in a clockwise rotation among the players. The round continues until one player can go out.

A player can go out if they can use all the cards in their hand to spell one or more allowable words. After a player goes out, every other player then has one more turn. On the last turn, each remaining player uses as many cards as possible to spell one or more allowable words.

After the round is finished, points on the cards used to spell words are counted toward the player's score. If the player had unused cards, the points on those remaining cards are subtracted. Ten-point bonuses are added to the score of the player with the longest word and to the player with the most words (if there are only two players, they should decide between them to limit the bonus to either the longest word or the most words).

The subsequent rounds follow in the same manner, with the hands increasing in size by one card each round. Thus, in the second round each player is dealt four cards, the third round five cards, and so forth. Points are added at the end of each round. The game continues until the end of the eighth round (ten cards in the hand). Depending on the number of players, the discard pile may need to be shuffled to resupply the draw pile.

The player with the most points at the end of the full eight rounds wins.

Allowable words

Players should decide on an English dictionary to be used during the game. An allowable word must appear as an entry in that dictionary or as one of the listed inflected forms of an entry word. Words must also use at least two cards. The makers of Quiddler have established several restrictions on the words used in a game. No proper nouns may be used. Capitalized adjectives, such as Iraqi and Scottish, may be used. Prefixes and suffixes by themselves are not allowable words. Words requiring a hyphen for proper spelling, such as ex-wife and twenty-two are also not allowed. The Quiddler rules disallow abbreviations, but do not differentiate between various forms. Players need to decide for themselves (or follow the example of the game dictionary) if they will allow acronym-derived words such as laser and NATO. The rules contain no restrictions on English words with accented letters, such as née, though the deck contains no such letters. Players must also decide for themselves if they will allow shortened word forms such as ad (for advertisement) and math.

A player may challenge any other player if they feel that the latter has used a word that is not an allowable word. If the word is an allowable word, the challenging player must subtract from their score the number of points in the word. If it is not, the challenged player must subtract from their score the number of points in the word. The challenged player may not re-arrange their cards to form other words.

Deck
The card deck consists of 118 cards with individual letters from the English alphabet or common two-letter combinations. These include QU, IN, ER, TH, and CL. Each card has a point value reflecting its use in English words. The colorful and stylistic designs on the cards are based on illuminated letters found in Celtic manuscripts written over 1000 years ago. These source inspirations include the Book of Kells and the Book of Durrow.
Quiddler deck contents with point value of each letter and number of each letter (and combo) in the deck:

Awards
Quiddler has won the following Best Game Awards:
2008 Monthly Top-10 Most Wanted Card Games
2008 TDmonthly Classic Toy Award
2008 Creative Child's Seal of Excellence Award
2007 Creative Child's Seal of Excellence Award
2005 Creative Child's Preferred Choice Award
2004 Newsweek - Perfect Present
2004 ASTRA Hot Toys
2002 First Choice by The Detroit News
2001 Educational Clearinghouse A+ Award
2001 3 Stars by The San Francisco Chronicle
1999 Parents' Choice Award
1999 MENSA Select Award
1999 Games Magazine 'Games 100' Award
1999 Dr. Toy's Best Vacation Winner
1999 Parents’ Council Award
1998 The Freedom Editions Award
1998 Best American Game - Tiger Award

Degrees of competition
In a similar vein to Scrabble, groups can play Quiddler with varying degrees of competition. Players in highly competitive games may consider memorizing lists of two- and three-letter words. It is also a good idea to know whether the game dictionary includes colloquial and contemporary words.

Notes

External links
Quiddler product page at Set Enterprises

Card games introduced in 1998
Dedicated deck card games
Mensa Select winners
Rummy
Single-player games
Word games